Lena Horne at the Waldorf Astoria is a 1957 live album by Lena Horne, conducted by Lennie Hayton, recorded in Stereo at the Waldorf-Astoria Hotel in New York City on the evening of December 31, 1956. One of the first non-classical live albums to be recorded in Stereo, the monaural album peaked at #24 in the Billboard Hot 200 and became the best selling record by a female artist in the history of the RCA Victor label. The album was re-issued on CD in 2002, by Collectables Records, together with Horne's 1961 live album Lena Horne at the Sands.

Track listing
"Today I Love Everybody" (Harold Arlen, Dorothy Fields) - 2.55
"Let Me Love You" (Bart Howard, Lou Levy) - 3.06
"Come Runnin'" (Roc Hillman) - 2.42
 Cole Porter Medley: "How's Your Romance?"/"After You"/"Love of My Life"/"It's All Right with Me" - 7:21
"Mood Indigo"/"I'm Beginning to See the Light" (Duke Ellington, Mitchell Parish, Barney Bigard, Irving Mills)/(Ellington, Don George, Johnny Hodges, Harry James) - 4:30
"How You Say It" (Matt Dubey, Harold Karr) - 3:16
"Honeysuckle Rose" (Fats Waller, Andy Razaf) - 2:59
"Day In, Day Out" (Rube Bloom, Johnny Mercer) - 2:07
"New Fangled Tango" (Dubey, Karr) - 3:06
"I Love to Love" (Herbert Baker) - 4:20
"From This Moment On" (Porter) - 1:57

Personnel
Lena Horne - vocals
Nat Brandwynne & His Orchestra - orchestra
Lennie Hayton - conductor

References

RCA Victor live albums
Lena Horne live albums
1957 live albums
Albums conducted by Lennie Hayton
albums arranged by Lennie Hayton